This is a list of films produced by the Ollywood film industry based in Bhubaneshwar and Cuttack in 2011:

A-Z

References

2011
2010s in Odisha
Ollywood
2011 in Indian cinema